Peter McFetridge (born March 18, 1986 in Vancouver, British Columbia) is a former professional indoor lacrosse transition. He played for the Vancouver Stealth and Calgary Roughnecks in the National Lacrosse League.

References

1986 births
Living people
Calgary Roughnecks players
Canadian lacrosse players
Lacrosse people from British Columbia
Lacrosse transitions
Sportspeople from Vancouver

Vancouver Warriors players